= Gustavo S. Mesch =

Israeli sociologist and professor emeritus of Digital Sociology

- Born: 1957 (age 68–69); Argentina
- Citizenship: Israeli
- Occupations: Sociologist, academic
- Known for: Sociology of the internet, digital inequalities, cyberbullying, cyber fraud

Academic background
- Education: University of Haifa (B.A., M.A.); The Ohio State University (Ph.D.)

Gustavo S. Mesch (born 1957) is an Israeli sociologist and professor emeritus of digital sociology at the University of Haifa. He served as Rector (Academic Provost) of the University of Haifa from 2016 to 2021 and is recognized for his research on the sociology of the internet, digital inequalities, youth internet culture, and cybercrime.

== Early life and education ==
Mesch was born in Argentina in 1957 and immigrated to Israel in 1973. He received his Registered Nurse diploma from Haim Shiba's School of Nursing in 1985. He earned a B.A. in Sociology and Education (1988) and an M.A. in sociology (1990) from the University of Haifa. He completed his Ph.D. in sociology at The Ohio State University in 1993.

== Career ==
Mesch joined the faculty of the University of Haifa in 1993 as a Lecturer, and was promoted to senior lecturer in 1998, Associate Professor in 2007, and full professor of sociology in 2011. He was a Visiting Senior Academic Researcher at the Oxford Internet Institute, University of Oxford, in 2004–2005. He also held visiting positions at the Centre for Urban Studies, University of Toronto (1998), and as Adjunct Lecturer and later Adjunct Associate Professor in Urzban Planning at the Technion – Israel Institute of Technology (1997–1998; 2010–2012).

He served as Chair of the Department of Sociology and Anthropology from 2001 to 2004 and again from 2007 to 2010. In 2011, he became a member of the University of Haifa's Board of Governors. In 2013, he was appointed Dean of the Herta and Paul Amir Faculty of Social Sciences serving until 2016. In 2016, he was appointed Rector of the University of Haifa. He is currently professor emeritus of digital sociology.

== Research ==
Mesch's research examines the social effects of new media, digital inequalities, youth internet culture, online social networks, cyberbullying, online hate speech, and cyber fraud. His research on cyber fraud was funded by the Israeli Ministry of Science and Technology.

=== Contributions to the study of the impact of social media on society ===
Mesch developed the social diversification hypothesis (SDH) to explain how digital media can reshape social inequalities. The hypothesis proposes that members of disadvantaged groups use the internet to build social capital and access resources that might otherwise be unavailable offline.

== Awards and recognition ==
In 2024, Mesch received an Honorable Mention for the Career Achievement Award from the Communication, Information Technologies, and Media Sociology (CITAMS) section of the American Sociological Association.

According to Research.com's 2025 ranking of Social Sciences and Humanities scientists, he is ranked #16 in Israel and #3,309 globally.

== Professional association leadership ==
Mesch was elected Chair of the Communications and Information Technology Section of the American Sociological Association (2008–2011) and served on the National Executive Committee of the Israeli Sociological Association (2007–2010).

== Editorial activities ==
From 2009 to 2015, Mesch served as editor-in-chief of Sociological Focus, the official journal of the North Central Sociological Association. He was Editor of the Section on Communications and Media for the International Encyclopedia of the Social and Behavioral Sciences, 2nd edition.

== Books ==
Mesch is co-author, with Ilan Talmud, of Wired Youth: The Social World of Adolescence in the Information Age (Routledge, 2010); second edition published as Wired Youth: The Online Social World of Adolescence in 2020.
